Main Street Historic District is a national historic district located at Hendersonville, Henderson County, North Carolina.  The district encompasses 65 contributing buildings in the central business district of Hendersonville. The commercial and governmental buildings include notable examples of Classical Revival architecture.  Located in the district is the separately listed Henderson County Courthouse.  Other notable buildings include the Huggins Building (c. 1850), Cole Bank Building (c. 1880), Justus Pharmacy, Davis Store block (1900), The Federal Building (1914), Maxwell Store Building (c. 1910), Pace's Market (c. 1925), J. C. Penney Building (1939), and Lampley Motors (c. 1945).

It was listed on the National Register of Historic Places in 1989, with a boundary increase in 2006.

Gallery

References

Historic districts on the National Register of Historic Places in North Carolina
Neoclassical architecture in North Carolina
Buildings and structures in Henderson County, North Carolina
National Register of Historic Places in Henderson County, North Carolina
Hendersonville, North Carolina